Taiwan has one of the most efficient recycling programs globally, with a 55% collection rate from households and businesses and a 77% collection rate from industrial wastes in 2019. Taiwan’s high recycling rates are unattainable in most countries due to Taiwanese geographical advantages along with efficient waste processing technologies and systems.

History
The history of recycling in Taiwan can be traced back to the Revisions to Articles 4, 11 and 20 and addition of Articles 10-1 and 23-1 promulgated by presidential order on November 11, 1988. Second effort was made through the Revisions to Articles 10-1, 23-1 and 31 promulgated by presidential order on March 28, 1997 (See Legislative History of Waste Disposal Act), and the 4-in-1 recycling program initiated by the Environmental Protection Administration and implemented in 1997. The 4-in-1 recycling program serves as a recycling and disposal system that collects fees to establish a recycling fund to further promote the waste management system of Taiwan.  Prior to the introduction of the recycling program, Taiwan’s landfills were filling up due to rapid economic growth during the late 1970s.  The economic development of the island led to 8,800 metric tonnes of MSW (municipal solid waste) accumulating a day by 1979, 18,800 by 1990, and around 21,900 tonnes by 1992.  By the mid-’90s, the waste management infrastructure included a little more than 400 nearly full landfills, resulting in Taiwan being nicknamed “garbage island”.

The 4-in-1 recycling program is part of Taiwan's extended producer responsibility (EPR) scheme. The fees charged by this program are paid by manufacturers and importers to the government, which uses this money to fund recycling programs such as educational campaigns and the development of new recycling programs. In 1997, the recycling rate in Taiwan was 5.87%; however, that has increased to over 60% in some areas as of 2011, with a nationwide average of 55%. At the same time, household daily waste has decreased from 1.14kg to 0.43kg. Furthermore, by 2002, MSW production has dropped by 27% from 1997.

Taiwan has sought to contribute to the global frontier in tackling issues of waste management; however, due to Taiwan not being a member of the United Nations or the World Health Organization, reports stemming from Taiwan have often been disregarded.

Residential recycling 
The government encourages its residents to recycle by implementing policies where residents have to purchase specific types and colors of trash bags that are based on where one lives. The bags vary in size and price, which assists in supporting the costs of the Taiwanese waste management system. Residents place the items in the appropriate bags and then they are normally picked up by two different trucks. Of these trucks, one is dedicated towards regular wastes and the other is dedicated to recyclable wastes and food wastes.

Recycling categories
According to Article 5 of Taiwan's Waste Disposal Act, which is defined by Recycling Regulations in Taiwan and the 4-in-1 Recycling Program, regulated recyclable waste, otherwise known as RRW, includes 13 categories and 33 different items. The categories include metal containers, aluminum containers, Tetra Pak brand containers, paper tableware, plastic containers, containers of pesticides, batteries, automobiles/motorcycles, tires, lead-acid batteries, computer appliances, electrical appliances, and lightbulbs/tubes. Of these regulated recyclable wastes, depending on whether it falls under general or industrial waste, according to Article 15 of Taiwan's Waste Disposal Act, it is the responsibility of manufactures, importers, and retailers to accept these wastes from customers for recycling purposes. Depends on the rule by the local government, recycling categories can be about 15 or more. For example, Taoyuan City's multilingual flyer(資源回收多國語言文宣) shows 18 recycling categories.

Lightbulbs and tube lights 
The recycling rates of fluorescent lamps in Taiwan are 88% as of 2019. In recycling fluorescent lamps, Taiwan uses the method of thermal desorption.

General batteries 
The recycling rates for dry batteries in Taiwan are 45% as of 2019. In recycling dry batteries, Taiwan uses the method of a batch process distillation.

Recycling of hazardous materials 
According to Article 15 of Taiwan's Waste Disposal Act, it states that manufacturers, importers and retailers maintain the responsibility  of recycling and treating hazardous substances that have been disposed that may have serious polluting effects on the environment.

iTrash stations

Taiwan has begun to implement iTrash stations, designed by Hao-Yang Environment Technology Ltd., which is essentially a reverse vending machine that charges for household garbage and pays for recycling. The iTrash stations offer credit on users' EasyCard, which serves as a smartcard that can be used for payments for Taipei Metro, public transportation and can even be used in businesses in Taipei. Initially, the iTrash station project started as a four month long trial in Taipei and in response to the trial, Liou Ming-lone, the commissioner of Technology Conservation Group's Department of Environmental Protection, stated that more iTrash stations will be implemented around the city of Taipei in 2019.

See also 
 Waste management in Taiwan
 Waste minimisation

References

Environment of Taiwan
Taiwan